The Jenny Jones Show is an American syndicated daytime tabloid talk show that was hosted by comedian/actress/singer Jenny Jones. It was produced by Quincy Jones-David Salzman Entertainment and Telepictures Productions and was distributed by Warner Bros. Domestic Television Distribution. The show ran for 12 seasons,  from September 16, 1991, until May 21, 2003; and was taped in Chicago, Illinois at WMAQ-TV studios.

Format
The Jenny Jones Show premiered in September 1991, in which it debuted on 178 television stations nationwide; this debut was the biggest launch in syndicated talk show history.

When the series began, a traditional talk show format reminiscent of Oprah was used. However, ratings were low during the first two seasons, and by 1993 it began to move away from serious subjects and began to take on more unusual subjects and theme shows such as paternity tests, out-of-control teens (including shows in which they are sent to boot camp), confronting former bullies (something Jones dealt with when she was young), makeovers for people who had no sense of fashion or style, celebrity impersonators, talent contests (and at times, people who made it an obsession to enter them, especially parents of the children who enter the pageants/contests/shows), feuding neighbors, strippers and secret crushes.

The show would also feature regular live performances by bands of varying genres (notably pop, punk, rock, hip-hop, and R&B), ranging from lesser known bands from the local Chicago area to more well known bands from around the U.S. and Canada. Many well-known artists first appeared on Jenny Jones including Usher, Ludacris, Tamar Braxton, Nelly, and Three Six Mafia, who made their first national TV appearance on the show. The final live performance of alternative rock band Dinosaur Jr. before their initial 1997 disbandment was a performance of "Out There" on the show earlier that year.

Murder of Scott Amedure

On March 6, 1995, Jenny Jones taped an episode called "Revealing Same Sex Secret Crush" on which Scott Amedure, a gay man, confessed to an associate, Jonathan Schmitz, that he had a crush on him. Schmitz appeared unconcerned as he laughed about that revelation in front of the audience. However, three days after the taping, an upset Schmitz killed Amedure.

After the murder made headlines, the producers decided not to air the show, though it aired during Court TV's (now TruTV) coverage of the trial as part of the presentation of evidence to the jury. Clips of the episode were also featured in the HBO documentary Talked to Death, and the first episode of the Netflix docuseries Trial By Media. Schmitz's history of mental illness and alcohol/drug abuse came to light during the trial in which Schmitz was later convicted of second degree murder. Jones and the producers were later sued by Amedure's family for neglecting to find out Schmitz's history of mental illness and substance abuse. Jones testified under oath that the producers told Schmitz that his admirer could be a man, but Schmitz thought that the admirer was a woman. Amedure's family won the ruling and the show was ordered to pay $25 million, but that decision was later overturned by the Michigan appellate court which ruled that the producers were not responsible for what happened to the guests after their appearance on the show. Schmitz was released on parole on August 21, 2017.

Backlash
This incident (and other subjects) led to Dino Corbin, then-general manager of Chico, California, CBS affiliate KHSL-TV, to remove The Jenny Jones Show from its line-up. Corbin claimed that what he perceived to be constant objectionable material (one show involving a transgender dating search that KHSL refused to air) was his reason for the cancellation, not the murder.

Final years
By its final two seasons, the show had dropped heavily in the ratings. It was nearly cancelled at the conclusion of season 11, but was saved by a last-minute deal with the Tribune Broadcasting station group, although the subsequent station shuffle necessitated in such key markets as New York City, Chicago and Los Angeles didn't help the ratings erosion.

In the 2002-2003 TV season, Jones' program became the lowest-rated daytime talk show , and after the last episode aired that spring, Jenny Jones was canceled in the summer of 2003. Reruns continued to air until September 12 of that year.

Cast of characters
The show also had an in-house cast of regulars, some of whom were originally guests:

 Rude Jude, a DJ who became a fan favorite for his appearance on his past being a bully. He made frequent appearances as an advisor.
 Raymond Moses, a drill sergeant for troubled young children recognized for his intimidating presence and booming voice. According to his brother, Moses closed his boot camp business in 2013, ten years after the show ended.
 Tornado "Big Daddy WooWoo" (Comedian)
 Chela Thomas
 Valerie Mikita
CJ Belle, fetish model, performance artist

References

External links
 Jenny Jones' recollection of The Jenny Jones Show on her website
 

1991 American television series debuts
1990s American television talk shows
2000s American television talk shows
2003 American television series endings
American live television series
Chicago television shows
English-language television shows
First-run syndicated television programs in the United States
Television series by Warner Bros. Television Studios
Television series by Telepictures